The Adler Mannheim (English: Mannheim Eagles, formerly Mannheimer ERC) is a professional ice hockey team of the Deutsche Eishockey Liga, the highest-level ice hockey league in Germany. The team is based in Mannheim, a city in the northern part of Baden-Württemberg. Currently, the team plays at SAP Arena, where they moved to at the beginning of the 2005–06 season after having played at Eisstadion am Friedrichspark for nearly seven decades from 1938 through 2005. They have won the German Championship a total of eight times, seven of those coming after 1994 in the Deutsche Eishockey Liga.

History
German ice hockey changed significantly with the formation of the Deutsche Eishockey Liga (DEL) in 1994. Its growing influence also brought growing independence from the German Ice Hockey Federation (DEB) which had regulated ice hockey in Germany for many decades.

Pre-DEL era
The first incarnation of the Adler Mannheim was the 'Mannheim Ice and Roller Sport Club' (Mannheimer Eis- und Rollsport-Club or MERC), founded on 19 May 1938. On 19 February 1939, they had their introductory match in the brand new Friedrichspark Stadium. The match against the winner of the German Championship was lost 0–11, but the following seasons were more and more successful. However, due to the ongoing Second World War, it was difficult to play a regular season without some limitations. In 1942, after the Mannheim was qualified for the finals, the proclamation of the total war led to the cancellation of the finals, less than 24 hours before their scheduled beginning.

On 5 June 1943, the Eisstadion am Friedrichspark was destroyed by an air attack on Mannheim. After the end of the Second World War in 1945, it took another four years before the hockey club began playing once again. In the 1951/52 season, Mannheim again had a team to play in a regular team, but it was not very successful. The most successful game in this time was a 10–2 victory against a team of American soldiers based in the Mannheim-area.

Promotion to first division and first German championship
In 1978, the MERC achieved promotion to the first division of Eishockey Bundesliga. In order to be able to set up a team with the limited budget, the MERC and coach Heinz Weisenbach had to get innovative. Weisenbach traveled to North America to search specifically for players with German roots. With Harold Kreis, Manfred "Mannix" Wolf, Roy Roedger and Peter Ascherl, the first "German-Canadians" were transferred into the Eishockey Bundesliga. Additionally, Mannheim acquired the national goalkeeper Erich Weishaupt from the Berliner Schlittschuhclub (Berliner SC). After a sixth place in their debut season, Mannheim strengthened their squad with Ron Andruff and Holger Meitinger and the national players Mannheimer Marcus Kuhl (Cologne) and Peter Obresa (Bad Nauheim). In a complicated tournament mode, from preliminary round, second round and championship round, the MERC would finally win the German championship for the first time. The title win was solidified with a victory in Berlin, and the Mannheim players warmed-up in tailcoats and top hats before their final, inconsequential home game against Cologne EC.

DEL era

Four DEL championships in 5 years
In 1994, the Mannheimer ERC was a founding member of the Deutsche Eishockey Liga (DEL). While the organization of the MERC continues to exist to the present day, the professional hockey team changed its name to Adler Mannheim and was transformed into an independent legal entity called "Die Adler Mannheim Eishockey Spielbetriebs GmbH + Co. KG". The old organization MERC still performs in the amateur and junior sectors, including the successful junior team Jungadler Mannheim ('Mannheim Young Eagles') (DNL).

The first two seasons in the DEL ended in playoff quarter finals, but the following season marked the first full success of the DEL era: the Adler Mannheim swept through the playoffs. With the minimum number of nine games, they won the championship in 1997. After also winning the championships in 1998 and 1999, head coach Lance Nethery and several players left the team.

After a disastrous start to the regular 1999–2000 season, the Adler reached the playoffs again, but were beaten in the quarter finals again. After that season, head coach Chris Valentine was released and was succeeded by Bill Stewart. In 2000–01, the  Adler returned to winning ways with the fourth DEL championship in five years.

In their final season at Friedrichspark, Mannheim native Jochen Hecht (Buffalo Sabres), Cristobal Huet (Montreal Canadiens), Yannick Tremblay (Atlanta Thrashers) and Sven Butenschön (New York Islanders) joined the Adler during the 2004–05 NHL lockout. The team made it to the finals, but were defeated by the Eisbären Berlin.

Move to SAP Arena and 5th DEL championship
The following season was disastrous. In their new home, the SAP Arena, the team was placed tenth at the end of the regular season. It was the first time in 26 years that the Adler Mannheim had not qualified for the playoffs.

Making several changes ito the team roster, the team celebrated its resurrection in the following 2006–07 season. After winning the German Cup, they finished in first place in the regular season and then won their fifth DEL Championship.

Adler Mannheim and the NHL
On 6 July 2010, the Adler Mannheim competed against the San Jose Sharks in the 2011 NHL Premiere Challenge 2010. German national player Manuel Klinge scored for Mannheim in the 5th minute, San Jose equalized with a goal by Jamie McGinn (54th minute). After Devin Setoguchi scored for San Jose, Mannheim's Jame Pollock scored the equalizer at minute 57. In the shoot-out, it was Dan Boyle who scored with the decisive penalty shot for the Sharks.

In July 2011, Mannheim entered a developmental partnership with the Toronto Maple Leafs of the NHL.

The Adler participated in the 2011 NHL Premiere series, losing to the Buffalo Sabres 8–3. The Sabres (who counted among its players Mannheim native Jochen Hecht) were very well received in Mannheim, and later that season, a contingent of Adler fans traveled to Buffalo and Toronto to witness games hosted by the Sabres and Maple Leafs.

During the 2012 NHL lockout, the Adler Mannheim became a popular team for the lockout-players again. The former Mannheim-players Dennis Seidenberg (Boston Bruins) and Marcel Goc (Florida Panthers) joined the team once more. They were followed by Jason Pominville, captain of the Buffalo Sabres and again Jochen Hecht who was a free agent since his injury in early 2012. Hecht signed a contract (with a NHL-Out paragraph) until 2014, but after the lockout came to an end, he was offered a new, one-year contract by the Buffalo Sabres. After the Sabres contract expired, Hecht announced his intention to return to Mannheim to finish his professional career.

6th DEL championship and turbulent times

On 19 June 2014, Mannheim hired Boston Bruins assistant coach Geoff Ward as their new head coach. After winning the regular season with nine points ahead of the second-placed EHC Red Bull München, the Adler won the quarter-final series against the Nürnberg Ice Tigers 4–1. In the semi-finals, the Adler swept Grizzly Adams Wolfsburg with 4–0 victories – even after being down 0–3 goals in three of the games. In the final, Mannheim finally met ERC Ingolstadt. After a devastating 1–6 loss in the third game with Ingolstadt taking the 2–1 lead in the final series, the Adler turned the series and won all subsequent games. With 4–2 victories, the Adler Mannheim were able to win their sixth DEL championship.

After the 2014–15 season, Ward returned to the NHL and was replaced by Greg Ireland. Ireland was sacked in February 2016, and Craig Woodcroft, who had joined the Adler coaching staff in 2014, was promoted to head coach. Woodcroft failed to guide the Adler squad to the playoffs and left after the 2015–16 season. In May 2016, Sean Simpson was named new head coach.

Successful transition and 7th DEL championship
On 4 December 2017, GM Teal Fowler, head coach Simpson and assistant coach Colin Muller were sacked due to unsatisfactory results. Bill Stewart, who had guided the club to the 2001 DEL title, took over the head coaching job. During the 2017–2018 season, the Adler Mannheim announced Jan-Axel Alavaara as the new GM and Pavel Gross as their new head coach assisted by Mike Pellegrims and Pertti Hasanen.

The Adler finished their regular season 2018–19 at the top of the standings table with a new point average record of 2,23 points per game and won the DEL title 2018–19 defeating EHC Red Bull München 4–1 in the playoff finals. During the summer break, the Adler Mannheim released their long-time team captain Marcus Kink – his successor being NHL veteran and German national player Marcel Goc. Also during the summer break  of2019, Adler Mannheim's rookie defenseman Moritz Seider was drafted in the first round of the NHL Entry Draft, sixth overall, by the Detroit Red Wings. Seider was the first German defenseman to be selected in the first round of an NHL Entry Draft, and the fourth-highest German-born player to be selected until Tim Stützle was selected third overall by the Ottawa Senators in the 2020 NHL Draft. On 14 July 2019, Seider was signed to a three-year, entry-level contract with the Detroit Red Wings. On 27 December 2020, Stützle signed a three-year, entry-level contract with the Ottawa Senators.

Honours

Domestic
Deutsche Eishockey Liga
  Winners: 1997, 1998, 1999, 2001, 2007, 2015, 2019
  Runners-up: 2002, 2005, 2012
Deutscher Eishockey-Pokal
  Winners: 2003, 2007
  Runners-up: 2006
Eishockey-Bundesliga
  Winners: 1980
  Runners-up: 1982, 1983, 1985, 1987

International
Lehner Cup
  Runners-up: 2017, 2018

Players

Current roster

Honorable players
{|
|-
| valign="top" |

{|
| valign="top" |

{|
| valign="top" |

{|
|-
| valign="top" |

{|
| valign="top" |

{|
| valign="top" |

Retired numbers

1After his death, the Adler Mannheim, the Kölner Haie and the EHC Klostersee retired his #80. At the beginning of the season 2008–09, his number was retired league-wide by the DEL.

Championship teams
 1979/80: Erich Weishaupt, Joachim Casper, Harold Kreis, Werner Jahn, Brent Meeke, Bogoslaw Malinowski, Norbert Mundo, Marcus Kuhl, Ron Andruff, Holger Meitinger, Peter Obresa, Manfred Wolf, Dany Djakalovic, Peter Ascherl, Elias Vorlicek, Klaus Mangold, Jürgen Adams, Jörg Etz and Roy Roedger; Heinz Weisenbach (coach).
 1996/97: Joachim Appel, Mike Rosati, Harold Kreis, Paul Stanton, Christian Lukes, Robert Nardella, Alexander Erdmann, Stéphane Richer, Martin Ulrich, Mike Pellegrims; Steve Thornton, Mario Gehrig, Pavel Gross, Dave Tomlinson, Daniel Körber, Rob Cimetta, François Guay, Jochen Hecht, Florian Keller, Till Feser, Philippe Bozon, Tommie Hartogs, Alexander Serikow, Christian Pouget, Dieter Kalt and Paul Beraldo; Lance Nethery (coach).
 1997/98: Klaus Merk, Mike Rosati, Christian Künast, Darren Rumble, Gordon Hynes, Paul Stanton, Christian Lukes, Mike Posma, Christopher Felix, Stéphane Richer, Martin Ulrich, Mike Pellegrims, Alexander Erdmann, Mario Gehrig, Pavel Gross, Dave Tomlinson, Philippe Bozon, Rob Cimetta, François Guay, Jochen Hecht, Ole Eskild Dahlstrøm, Mike Hudson, Alexander Serikow, Christian Pouget, Denis Chassé, Ron Pasco, Daniel Marois, Philipp Schumacher and Dieter Kalt; Lance Nethery (coach).
 1998/99: Sven Rampf, Pavel Cagas, Danny Lorenz, Helmut de Raaf, Gordon Hynes, Paul Stanton, Reid Simonton, Christian Lukes, Denis Perez, Stéphane Richer, Mike Pellegrims, Michael de Angelis, Brian Tutt, Mark Etz, Pavel Gross, Dave Tomlinson, Philippe Bozon, Kevin Miehm, Jason Young, Ron Pasco, Mike Hudson, Alexander Serikow, Christian Pouget, Mike Stevens, Philip Schumacher, Jan Alston and Jackson Penney; Lance Nethery (coach).
 2000/01: Mike Rosati, Robert Müller, Helmut de Raaf, Bradley Bergen, Andy Roach, Christian Lukes, Francois Groleau, Stéphane Richer, Yves Racine, Dennis Seidenberg, Michael Bakos; Gordon Hynes, Mark Etz, Dave Tomlinson, Steve Junker, Wayne Hynes, Devin Edgerton, Ron Pasco, Marc Pederson, Georg Hessel, Todd Hlushko, Mike Stevens, Jan Alston, Jean-Francois Jomphe, Daniel Hilpert, Christopher Straube and Jackson Penney; Bill Stewart (coach).
2006/07 Jean-Marc Pelletier, Ilpo Kauhanen, Danny aus den Birken, Robert Müller, Blake Sloan, Sven Butenschön, Pascal Trepanier, François Bouchard, Martin Ancicka, Felix Petermann, Stephan Retzer, Nathan Robinson, Eduard Lewandowski, Jason Jaspers, Tomas Martinec, Christoph Ullmann, René Corbet, Colin Forbes, Rico Fata, Jeff Shantz, François Méthot, Ronny Arendt, Marcus Kink and Rick Girard; Greg Poss / Teal Fowler (coaches)
2014/15 Dennis Endras, Youri Ziffzer, Sinan Akdağ, Dominik Bittner, Christopher Fischer, Kurtis Foster, Nikolai Goc, Bobby Raymond, Denis Reul, Danny Richmond, Steve Wagner, Ronny Arendt, Martin Buchwieser, Jochen Hecht, Mirko Höfflin, Kai Hospelt, Andrew Joudrey, Marcus Kink (C), Frank Mauer, Glen Metropolit, Matthias Plachta, Jon Rheault, Jamie Tardif, Christoph Ullmann and Brandon Yip – Geoff Ward, Jay Leach and Craig Woodcroft (coaches)
2018/19 Dennis Endras, Chet Pickard, Sinan Akdağ, Mark Katic, Cody Lampl, Joonas Lehtivuori, Thomas Larkin, Brendan Mikkelson, Janik Möser, Denis Reul, Moritz Seider, Luke Adam, Tim Bernhardt, Andrew Desjardins, Markus Eisenschmid, Garret Festerling, Marcel Goc, Tommi Huhtala, Phil Hungerecker, Marcus Kink (C), Chad Kolarik, Nicolas Krämmer, Alex Lambacher, Matthias Plachta, Brent Raedeke, Ben Smith and David Wolf – Pavel Gross, Mike Pellegrims and Pertti Hasanen (coaches)

Head coaches
The following list shows all head coaches of Adler Mannheim during the DEL era.

Lance Nethery, 1994–99
Chris Valentine, 1999–00
Bill Stewart, 2000–04
Helmut de Raaf, 2004
Stéphane Richer, 2004–05
Greg Poss, 2005–07
Dave King, 2007–09
Teal Fowler (Interim), 2009
Doug Mason, 2009–10
Teal Fowler, 2010
Harold Kreis, 2010–13
Hans Zach, 2014
Geoff Ward, 2014–15
Greg Ireland, 2015–16
Craig Woodcroft, 2016
Sean Simpson, 2016–17
Bill Stewart, 2017–18
Pavel Gross, 2018–present

DEL Season records

Affiliated teams

Jungadler Mannheim
The youth performance center of the Adler Mannheim is called "Jungadler Mannheim" (youth eagles). Their under 20 junior team is 16-times national youth champion and record holder. Famous former Jungadler players are e.g. Dominik Kahun (Chicago Blackhawks), Leon Draisaitl (Edmonton Oilers), Moritz Seider (Detroit Red Wings), and Tim Stützle (Ottawa Senators).

ERC Mannheimer WildCats
The female contingent of the Mannheimer ERC carries the name "Wild Cats." The most successful period in the WildCats' career was between 1988 and 1994 during which they won three German championships and vice-championships. The Wildcats did not play during the 2005–06 season after four players terminated their contracts. Therefore, they were forced to temporarily withdraw from the league.

References

External links

 

1938 establishments in Germany
Deutsche Eishockey Liga teams
Ice hockey teams in Germany
Ice hockey teams in Baden-Württemberg
Sport in Mannheim
Ice hockey clubs established in 1938